Anwar ul-Haq Ahady (August 12, 1951) is a politician in Afghanistan, formerly serving as Afghan Minister of  Commerce and Industry. He had served as the nation's Finance Minister from December 2004 to February 5, 2009. Prior to that he held the position as head of Da Afghanistan Bank, the central bank of Afghanistan, from 2002 to 2004. He is also prominent academic and writer.

Early years 
Ahady was born on 12 August 1951 in Sarobi, Kabul province, Afghanistan. He is the son of Abdul Haqhas, a Pashtun and native of the Sarobi district in Kabul province. Ahady holds a Master of Business Administration (MBA) and a Ph.D in political science from the post-graduate faculty of Northwestern University, in Evanston, Illinois, north of Chicago. He earned a Bachelor's degree as well as a Master's degree in economics and political science from the American University of Beirut in Lebanon.

Careers 
Ahady served as an assistant professor of political science at Carleton College, in Northfield, Minnesota, in the United States, and as the banking director of Continental Elona of Chicago from 1985 to 1987. He was a professor of political science at Providence College, a Catholic university in Providence, Rhode Island, from 1987 to 2002. 

After the removal of the Taliban government and the formation of the Karzai administration in late 2001, Ahady was chosen as the head of Afghanistan's central bank, Da Afghanistan Bank. He has many writings in academic journals, books, and popular dailies of the United States.

Political affiliation 
Ahady is currently the elected leader of the Afghan Millat Party.

Works 
"The Decline of the Pashtuns in Afghanistan", Anwar-ul-Haq Ahady, Asian Survey, Vol. 35, No. 7. (Jul., 1995), pp. 621–634.

References

External links

|-

1951 births
Living people
Finance Ministers of Afghanistan
Industry ministers of Afghanistan
Trade ministers of Afghanistan
Governors of Da Afghanistan Bank
Afghan Millat Party politicians 
Pashtun people
Pashtun nationalists